The 2023 season will be the New Orleans Saints' upcoming 57th season in the National Football League, the 48th to host games at the Caesars Superdome and the second under head coach Dennis Allen. They will attempt to improve upon their 7–10 record from the previous year and make the playoffs for the first time since 2020.

Draft

Staff

Current roster

Preseason
The Saints' preseason opponents and schedule will be announced in the spring.

Regular season

2023 opponents
Listed below are the Saints' opponents for 2023. Exact dates and times will be announced in the spring.

References

External links
 

New Orleans
New Orleans Saints seasons
New Orleans Saints